In mathematics, Verdier duality is a cohomological duality in algebraic topology that generalizes Poincaré duality for manifolds.
Alexander Grothendieck's theory of
Poincaré duality in étale cohomology
for schemes in algebraic geometry. It is thus (together with the said étale theory and for example Grothendieck's coherent duality) one instance of Grothendieck's six operations formalism.

Verdier duality generalises the classical Poincaré duality of manifolds in two directions: it applies to continuous maps from one space to another (reducing to the classical case for the unique map from a manifold to a one-point space), and it applies to spaces that fail to be manifolds due to the presence of singularities. It is commonly encountered when studying constructible or perverse sheaves.

Verdier duality
Verdier duality states that (subject to suitable finiteness conditions discussed below)
certain derived image functors for sheaves are actually adjoint functors. There are two versions.

Global Verdier duality states that for a continuous map  of locally compact Hausdorff spaces, the derived functor of the direct image with compact (or proper) supports  has a right adjoint  in the derived category of 

Local Verdier duality states that

in the derived category of sheaves on Y. 
It is important to note that the distinction between the global and local versions is that the former relates morphisms between 
complexes of sheaves in the derived categories, whereas the latter relates internal Hom-complexes and so can be evaluated locally. Taking global sections of both sides in the local statement gives the global Verdier duality.

These results hold subject to the compactly supported direct image functor  having finite cohomological dimension.
This is the case if the there is a bound  such that the compactly supported cohomology
 vanishes for all fibres  (where )
This holds if all the fibres  are at most -dimensional manifolds or more generally at most -dimensional CW-complexes. 

The discussion above is about derived categories of sheaves of abelian groups. It is instead possible to consider a ring 
 and (derived categories of) sheaves of -modules; the case above corresponds to 
. 

Part of what makes Verdier duality interesting in the singular setting is that when  is not a manifold (a graph or singular algebraic variety for example) then the dualizing complex is not quasi-isomorphic to a sheaf concentrated in a single degree. From this perspective the derived category is necessary in the study of singular spaces.

defined by

It has the following properties:

Relation to classical Poincaré duality
Poincaré duality can be derived as a special case of Verdier duality. Here one explicitly calculates cohomology of a space using the machinery of sheaf cohomology.

Let  be the constant map to a point. Global Verdier duality then states

To understand how Poincaré duality is obtained from this statement, it is perhaps easiest to understand both sides piece by piece. Let 
 
be an injective resolution of the constant sheaf. Then by standard facts on right derived functors 

is a complex whose cohomology is the compactly supported cohomology of X. Since morphisms between complexes of sheaves (or vector spaces) themselves form a complex we find that

where the last non-zero term is in degree 0 and the ones to the left are in negative degree. Morphisms in the derived category are obtained from the homotopy category of chain complexes of sheaves by taking the zeroth cohomology of the complex, i.e.

For the other side of the Verdier duality statement above, we have to take for granted the fact that when X is a compact orientable n-dimensional manifold 

which is the dualizing complex for a manifold. Now we can re-express the right hand side as

We finally have obtained the statement that

By repeating this argument with the sheaf kX replaced with the same sheaf placed in degree i we get the classical Poincaré duality

See also
Poincaré duality
Six operations
Coherent duality
Derived category

References
 
 
 , Exposés I and II contain the corresponding theory in the étale situation
 
 

Topology
Homological algebra
Sheaf theory
Duality theories